The Rally of Democrats, Progressive and Independent, formerly known as La République En Marche, is a parliamentary group in the Senate of France including representatives of Renaissance (RE).

History 
The La République En Marche group in the Senate was officially by François Patriat, its first president, on 28 June 2017, and included 25 members, of which 23 left from the socialist group. The group contained 29 members before the 2017 renewal.

List of presidents

List of vice presidents 

 Xavier Iacovelli

Historical membership

See also 

Renaissance group (National Assembly)

References

External links 
 Lists of senators by political group 
 Historical composition of the Senate and political groups 

Senate (France)
Parliamentary groups in France
La République En Marche!